Guillaume Chastagnol (born 12 December 1974) is a French snowboarder. He competed in the men's halfpipe event at the 1998 Winter Olympics.

References

External links
 

1974 births
Living people
French male snowboarders
Olympic snowboarders of France
Snowboarders at the 1998 Winter Olympics
Sportspeople from La Tronche
20th-century French people